2nd Independent Division of Chengdu Military Region was formed in January 1969 from the 9th, 11th, 20th and 23rd Independent Regiments of Chengdu Military Region. The division was itself composed of four regiments, regiments 5th to 8th. From May 1, 1955 to October 1969 Chengdu Military Region also acted as Sichuan Military Region.

In February 1970 the division was renamed as 2nd Independent Division of Sichuan Provincial Military District.

The division was disbanded in 1976.

References
中国各省军区独立师的历史沿革, https://web.archive.org/web/20160918225002/http://www.360doc.com/content/13/1205/20/1164894_334784330.shtml

IS2
Military units and formations established in 1969
Military units and formations disestablished in 1976